Cylindrobulla beauii is a species of sea snail, a marine gastropod mollusk in the family Cylindrobullidae.

Cylindrobulla beauii is the type species of the genus Cylindrobulla.

Description 
The maximum recorded shell length is 13.6 mm.

Habitat 
Minimum recorded depth is 0 m. Maximum recorded depth is 40 m.

References

External links 

Cylindrobullidae
Gastropods described in 1857